Benjamin Chukwuma Ozumba (born 21 March 1954) is a Nigerian Professor of Obstetrics and Gynaecology who served as the 14th Vice Chancellor of the University of Nigeria, Nsukka. He succeeded Bath Okolo who was the 13th Vice Chancellor of the University of Nigeria.  Ozumba served as the provost of the college of medicine of the same university between the years 2004 and 2008.

Ozumba was born on 21 March 1954, in Abba, Njikoka Local Government Area of Anambra State. He attended Government College, Umuahia and University of Lagos to study medicine.  Ozumba was appointed the Vice-Chancellor of the University of Nigeria, Nsukka in June 2014. He served in this post until 2019.  Among his activities and accomplishments, he served on the Alliance for African Partnership consortium advisory board.   Ozumba was succeeded by Professor Charles Arizechukwu Igwe.

Selected scholarly articles
Benjamin Ozumba; et al. (2010/10/22). Hypertension, diabetes and overweight: looming legacies of the Biafran famine. Public Library of Science.
Benjamin Ozumba; et al. (2004/2). Diabetes mellitus in pregnancy in an African population. International Journal of Gynecology & Obstetrics.

References 

1954 births
Living people
Vice-Chancellors of the University of Nigeria